Saint-Laurent-le-Minier is a commune in the Gard department in the Occitanie region in southern France. It's the southern village of the Cévennes mountains, cross by the Vis river.

Population

See also
Communes of the Gard department

References

Communes of Gard